Hand-cranked submarine may refer to:
 
 American Diver
 Bayou St. John submarine
 H. L. Hunley (submarine)
 Intelligent Whale
 Nautilus (1800 submarine)
 Pioneer (submarine)
Sub Marine Explorer
 Turtle (submersible)